In rugby union, since their first meeting in 1891, the British & Irish Lions and the South Africa national team have contested 13 series, with South Africa winning nine to the Lions' four, and one drawn series in 1955. The two teams have played 49 matches; South Africa have won 25 times to the Lions' 18, with the remaining six matches finishing as draws. The Lions won the first two series between the two sides in 1891 and 1896, including wins in the first six matches, but then did not win another series until their unbeaten 1974 tour. After South Africa's victory in the 1980 series, the two teams did not meet again until 1997 as a result of apartheid sanctions; the Lions won the 1997 series, before South Africa won the next two tours; 2009 and 2021.

List of series

List of matches

 
South Africa national rugby union team matches
British & Irish Lions matches